Tang Yixin, born Tang Ting (9 December 1987), also known as Tina Tang, is a Chinese actress and singer.

Career
Tang began her career when she was picked by Zheng Xiaolong to play the role of Concubine Qi in Empresses in the Palace (2012).

In 2013, her role as Luo Cheng (played by Hans Zhang)'s lover in Heroes in Sui and Tang Dynasties received positive reviews from the audience, who said that her character was "refreshing" in a serious historical drama. She then played well-received supporting turns in Legend of Lu Zhen and Noble Bride: Regretless Love, which achieved the highest and second highest ratings respectively for the first half of 2013. Tang also had a minor role in Stephen Chow's fantasy blockbuster hit Journey to the West: Conquering the Demons.

Thereafter Tang starred in television series Refueling Lover (and its sequel Happy Lover), The Love of Happiness and the coming-of-age film Les Aventures d'Anthony.

In 2016, Tang co-starred in the xianxia drama Noble Aspirations. The drama was a hit and recorded the highest online views for 2016.

In 2017, she starred in historical drama The Advisors Alliance, playing Guo Zhao. The same year, she played the leading role in the palace drama Rule the World co-starring Raymond Lam.

Personal life 
Tang and actor Zhang Ruoyun revealed their relationship through Weibo on 2 August 2017. Tang and Zhang married in Ireland on 27 June 2019.

Filmography

Film

Television series

Variety show

Discography

Albums

Singles

References

External links 

1987 births
Living people
Chinese film actresses
Chinese television actresses
21st-century Chinese actresses
People from Suining
Actresses from Sichuan